Benjamin Faneuil Porter (1808–1868) was an American lawyer, reformer, and state legislator in Alabama. A noted advocate of public education, women's rights, and the abolition of the death penalty, Porter helped establish a state penitentiary and to limit the use of execution as a legal punishment. Originally a Whig, he later became a Republican.

References

1808 births
1868 deaths
Politicians from Charleston, South Carolina
People from Monroe County, Alabama
Alabama lawyers
Alabama Whigs
19th-century American politicians
Republican Party members of the Alabama House of Representatives
Lawyers from Charleston, South Carolina
19th-century American lawyers